Lateral to either olfactory groove are the internal openings of the anterior and posterior ethmoidal foramina (or canals).

The posterior ethmoidal foramen opens at the back part of this margin under cover of the projecting lamina of the sphenoid, and transmits the posterior ethmoidal vessels and nerve.

External links
  (#4)

Foramina of the skull